is a town located in Tokachi Subprefecture, Hokkaido, Japan.

As of September 2016, the town has an estimated population of 45,208 and a density of 97 persons per km2. The total area is 466.09 km2.

Climate

Notable persons from Otofuke 
Akira Ifukube composer
Takahiro Nishikawa
Fujinokawa Takeo

See also

References

External links

Official Website 

Towns in Hokkaido